Petrophila fluviatilis is a moth in the family Crambidae. It was described by Lansdown Guilding in 1830.

References

Petrophila
Moths described in 1830